Events from the year 1999 in Argentina

Incumbents
 President: Carlos Menem (1 January – 10 December), Fernando de la Rúa (10–31 December)
 Vice president: Carlos Ruckauf (1 January – 10 December), Carlos Álvarez (10-31 December)

Governors
Governor of Buenos Aires Province: Eduardo Duhalde (until 10 December); Carlos Ruckauf (from 10 December)
Governor of Catamarca Province: Arnoldo Castillo (until 10 December); Oscar Castillo (from 10 December)
Governor of Chaco Province: Ángel Rozas 
Governor of Chubut Province: Carlos Maestro then José Luis Lizurume
Governor of Córdoba: Ramón Mestre then José Manuel De la Sota
Governor of Corrientes Province: 
 until 19 June: Pedro Braillard Poccard
 19 June-17 December: Hugo Perié
 from 17 December: Ramón Mestre
Governor of Entre Ríos Province: Jorge Busti (until 11 December); Sergio Montiel (from 11 December)
Governor of Formosa Province: Gildo Insfrán
Governor of Jujuy Province: Eduardo Fellner
Governor of La Pampa Province: Rubén Marín
Governor of La Rioja Province: Ángel Maza
Governor of Mendoza Province: Arturo Lafalla (until 10 December); Roberto Iglesias (from 10 December)
Governor of Misiones Province: Ramón Puerta (until 10 December); Carlos Rovira (from 10 December)
Governor of Neuquén Province: Felipe Sapag
Governor of Río Negro Province: Pablo Verani
Governor of Salta Province: Juan Carlos Romero
Governor of San Juan Province: Jorge Escobar (until 10 December); Alfredo Avelín (from 10 December)
Governor of San Luis Province: Adolfo Rodríguez Saá
Governor of Santa Cruz Province: Néstor Kirchner
Governor of Santa Fe Province: Jorge Obeid (until 10 December); Carlos Reutemann (from 10 December)
Governor of Santiago del Estero: Carlos Juárez
Governor of Tierra del Fuego: José Arturo Estabillo
Governor of Tucumán: Antonio Domingo Bussi (until 29 October); Julio Miranda (from 29 October)

Vice Governors
Vice Governor of Buenos Aires Province: Rafael Romá (until 10 December); Felipe Solá (from 10 December)
Vice Governor of Catamarca Province: Simón Hernández (until 10 December); Hernán Colombo (from 10 December)
Vice Governor of Chaco Province: Miguel Pibernus (until 10 December); Roy Nikisch (from 10 December)
Vice Governor of Corrientes Province: Victor Hugo Maidana (until 19 June); vacant thereafter (from 19 June)
Vice Governor of Entre Rios Province: Héctor Alanis (until 11 December); Edelmiro Tomás Pauletti (from 11 December)
Vice Governor of Formosa Province: Floro Bogado
Vice Governor of Jujuy Province: vacant (until 10 December); Rubén Daza (from 10 December)
Vice Governor of La Pampa Province: Manuel Baladrón (until 10 December); Heriberto Mediza (from 10 December)
Vice Governor of La Rioja Province: Miguel Ángel Asís (until 10 December); Luis Beder Herrera (from 10 December)
Vice Governor of Misiones Province: Julio Alberto Ifrán (until 10 December); Mercedes Margarita Oviedo (from 10 December)
Vice Governor of Nenquen Province: Ricardo Corradi (until 10 December); Jorge Sapag (from 10 December)
Vice Governor of Rio Negro Province: Bautista Mendioroz
Vice Governor of Salta Province: Walter Wayar
Vice Governor of San Juan Province: Rogelio Rafael Cerdera (until 10 December); Wbaldino Acosta (from 10 December)
Vice Governor of San Luis Province: Mario Merlo (until 10 December); María Alicia Lemme (from 10 December)
Vice Governor of Santa Cruz: Eduardo Arnold (until 10 December); Sergio Acevedo (from 10 December)
Vice Governor of Santa Fe Province: Gualberto Venesia (until 10 December); Marcelo Muniagurria (from 10 December)
Vice Governor of Santiago del Estero: Darío Moreno (until 10 December); Mercedes Aragonés de Juárez (from 10 December)
Vice Governor of Tierra del Fuego: Miguel Ángel Castro

Events
 31 August – A Líneas Aéreas Privadas Argentinas flight crashes during takeoff from Aeroparque Jorge Newbery
 17 September – Armed robbers take hostage six Banco de la Nación Argentina employees
 24 October – Fernando de la Rúa wins the Argentine general election

Births

Deaths
 8 March – Adolfo Bioy Casares, writer, journalist, and translator (b. 1914)

See also

List of Argentine films of 1999

References

 
Years of the 20th century in Argentina
Argentina
1990s in Argentina
Argentina